The National Census of 1996 was the 1st comprehensive national census of the Republic of South Africa, after the end of Apartheid.

Pre-enumeration

Enumeration

Post-enumeration Survey

Results

Demographics

Employment

See also

 South African National Census of 2001
 Demographics of South Africa

References

External links 
 Official 1996 Census Website

Censuses in South Africa
1996 in South Africa
1996 censuses